Kelisa may refer to:
 Kelisa, West Azerbaijan
 Kelisa, Zanjan